The panniculus adiposus is the fatty layer of the subcutaneous tissues, superficial to a deeper vestigial layer of muscle, the panniculus carnosus.

It includes structures that are considered fascia by some sources but not by others. Some examples include the fascia of Camper and the superficial cervical fascia.

A group of disorders of inflammation of this layer is called panniculitis.

References

Skin anatomy